Corydoras ornatus (ornate corydoras) is a tropical freshwater fish belonging to the Corydoradinae sub-family of the family Callichthyidae.  It originates in inland waters in South America, and is found in the Lower Tapajós River basin in Brazil.

The fish will grow in length up to 1.9 inches (4.9 centimeters).  It lives in a tropical climate in water with a pH of 6.0 – 8.0, a water hardness of 2 – 25 dGH, and a temperature range of 74 – 79 °F (23 – 26 °C).  It feeds on worms, benthic crustaceans, insects, and plant matter.  It lays eggs in dense vegetation and adults do not guard the eggs.  The female holds 2–4 eggs between her pelvic fins, where the male fertilizes them for about 30 seconds.  Only then does the female swim to a suitable spot, where she attaches the very sticky eggs. The pair repeats this process until about 100 eggs have been fertilized and attached.

Corydoras ornatus is of commercial importance in the aquarium trade industry.

See also
 List of freshwater aquarium fish species

References

External links
 Photos at Fishbase

Corydoras
Fish described in 1976